Marco Amelia  (born 2 April 1982) is an Italian former professional footballer who played as a goalkeeper, and current coach.

A Roma youth product, Amelia spent most of his professional club career at Livorno, where he made 181 appearances across all competitions, including playing and scoring in the 2006–07 UEFA Cup. He later played for several other Italian clubs, and also had a spell in England as a reserve goalkeeper with Chelsea.

At international level, Amelia won a bronze medal at the 2004 Olympics, and earned nine senior caps for Italy between 2005 and 2009. He was part of the squad that won the 2006 FIFA World Cup, also being included for Italy's UEFA Euro 2008 and 2009 FIFA Confederations Cup squads.

Club career

Early career
Born in Frascati, Province of Rome, Amelia grew up as part of the Roma youth system, and initially played as a forward, before playing in goal. In 2001, he left the Giallorossi to join Serie C1 club Livorno on loan, playing only once in his first season with the Tuscan side; he was successively confirmed by Livorno in the 2002–03 season, for a transfer fee of €2.8 million, as part of the deal that acquired half of Giorgio Chiellini's registration rights for €3.1 million, and promoted as regular by head coach Roberto Donadoni in the club's Serie B comeback campaign.

Amelia then spent two unremarkable loan spells at Lecce and Parma (both Serie A) before returning to Livorno in June 2004, becoming one of the team mainstays since then, and also having his chance to make a debut at European level in the 2006–07 UEFA Cup, where he even managed to score a goal during the group stage, an injury time header in a 1–1 draw against Partizan in November 2006.

Palermo
In July 2008, after Livorno were relegated to Serie B, Amelia agreed a permanent deal and contract to join Palermo, for €6 million. Among the highlights of his season, Amelia was mostly remembered by fans for saving Ronaldinho's penalty in a 3–1 win over Milan, but also, in a more negative fashion, for failing to deal with Giuseppe Mascara's 49-yard strike in the Derby di Sicilia, which ended in a shocking 0–4 home loss for his side.

Genoa
In August 2009, Amelia moved to Genoa as part of a player exchange deal, with Rubinho moving the other way, both players valued €5 million. Amelia was the first choice of the team except a few matches played by backup Alessio Scarpi.

Milan
On 23 June 2010, and after the sale of goalkeeper Marco Storari to Juventus, Amelia was signed by Milan on loan in a deal which included the right to purchase the player at the end of the year-long loan.

On 24 May 2011, Milan exercised its option to purchase Amelia for €3.5 million on a three-year contract, despite Amelia only making a handful of appearances and being second-choice to Christian Abbiati all season. Amelia made his debut in the 2011–12 season in Serie A, on 28 November 2011 against Chievo, replacing Abbiati, who suffered a shoulder injury. Amelia went on to make 14 appearances for Milan that season.

In the 2012–13 season, his third season at Milan, Amelia continued to be second-choice to Abbiati, making 11 first-team appearances. Milan did not renew Amelia's contract at the end of 2013–14 season. Amelia and Daniele Bonera had a fight on 19 May in the return journey from the opening of Milan's new headquarters, Casa Milan. Amelia denied any fight, saying it was only an argument.

Later career
Amelia became a free agent on 1 July 2014. He spent a few months with amateur side Rocca Priora (where he served as a player and honorary president) before returning to professional football on 9 February 2015, for Serie B club Perugia.

On 23 August 2015, Amelia became the honorary president and a player for Lega Pro newcomers Lupa Castelli Romani. He had played twice for Lupa Castelli Romani in 2015–16 Coppa Italia Lega Pro.

On 31 August, he cancelled his contract with the club.

On 8 October 2015, he moved abroad for the first time, signing for English Premier League club Chelsea on a free transfer, on a deal until the end of the season, with the team adding him as back-up goalkeeper to Asmir Begović due to an injury to Thibaut Courtois.

On 10 June 2016, it was announced Amelia would leave Chelsea on the expiry of his contract.

On 27 February 2017, Amelia signed a six-month contract with Serie B club Vicenza.

International career
Amelia made his debut for the Italy under-15 side in March 1998, in a tournament held in France.

With the Italy under-21 side, Amelia was the starting goalkeeper in Claudio Gentile's squad that won the 2004 UEFA European Under-21 Championship. Later that year, he served as a back-up to Ivan Pelizzoli in the Italy under-23 squad which won a bronze medal at the 2004 Summer Olympics in Athens.

Amelia made his senior debut for Italy at age 23, on 16 November 2005, coming on as a second-half substitute in a 1–1 friendly draw against the Ivory Coast, in Geneva. He later became a permanent member of Marcello Lippi's squad, and was called up as Italy's third goalkeeper at the 2006 FIFA World Cup, behind Gianluigi Buffon and Angelo Peruzzi, and ahead of reserve Morgan De Sanctis. Italy went on to win the tournament, although Amelia did not feature in any matches throughout the competition.

Following Peruzzi's retirement, Amelia became Italy's second-choice goalkeeper, behind Buffon. He was called up as Buffon's back-up for UEFA Euro 2008 by manager Roberto Donadoni and for the 2009 FIFA Confederations Cup by Donadoni's replacement, Lippi. Amelia's last appearance for Italy came on 10 June 2009 in a 4–3 friendly win against New Zealand, in Pretoria. In total, Amelia has made nine appearances for Italy.

Managerial career
After retirement, Amelia received his UEFA A coaching licence on 15 December 2017. In July 2018, he was appointed as the new head coach of Serie D club Lupa Roma.

On 29 June 2019, he moved to Serie D club Vastese. He was sacked on 28 January 2020 due to poor results.

On 1 March 2021, he agreed to return at Livorno as the club's new head coach, replacing Alessandro Dal Canto at the helm of the struggling Serie C side. He failed to save Livorno from relegation to Serie D and left by the end of the season; the club was successively dissolved due to longstanding financial issues.

On 29 September 2021, he was hired by Serie D club Prato. However, his period in charge of Prato lasted only two months, as he was dismissed on 27 December 2021.

Personal life
Amelia is married to an Italian woman, Carlotta Bosello. They have two children together: their son Giulio Cesare Amelia was born on 28 September 2009, and their daughter Matilde Amelia was born on 19 February 2013.

Career statistics

Club

International

Managerial

Honours
Roma
Serie A: 2000–01

Livorno
Serie C1: 2001–02

Milan
Serie A:  2010–11
Supercoppa Italiana: 2011

Italy
FIFA World Cup: 2006

Italy U21
UEFA European Under-21 Championship: 2004

Italy Olympics
Olympics Bronze medal: 2004

Orders
 5th Class / Knight: Cavaliere Ordine al Merito della Repubblica Italiana: 2004

 4th Class / Officer: Ufficiale Ordine al Merito della Repubblica Italiana: 2006

 CONI: Golden Collar of Sports Merit: Collare d'Oro al Merito Sportivo: 2006

References

External links

 
 Profile at official club website
 Profile at Assocalciatori.it 
 International caps at FIGC.com 

1982 births
Living people
People from Frascati
U.S. Livorno 1915 players
A.S. Roma players
2006 FIFA World Cup players
FIFA World Cup-winning players
Association football goalkeepers
Footballers at the 2004 Summer Olympics
Italian footballers
Italy international footballers
Italy youth international footballers
Italy under-21 international footballers
Olympic bronze medalists for Italy
Olympic footballers of Italy
Parma Calcio 1913 players
Serie A players
Serie B players
U.S. Lecce players
Palermo F.C. players
UEFA Euro 2008 players
2009 FIFA Confederations Cup players
Genoa C.F.C. players
A.C. Milan players
Olympic medalists in football
S.S. Racing Club Roma players
Chelsea F.C. players
Italian expatriate footballers
Expatriate footballers in England
Italian expatriate sportspeople in England
Medalists at the 2004 Summer Olympics
Officers of the Order of Merit of the Italian Republic
Knights of the Order of Merit of the Italian Republic
Footballers from Rome
Italian football managers
U.S. Livorno 1915 managers
Serie C managers
Serie D managers
Footballers from Lazio
Sportspeople from the Metropolitan City of Rome Capital